Biosprint is a microbiological feed additive produced and worldwide distributed by the Italian biotech company Prosol S.p.A. This zoo-technical additive contains cells of the yeast Saccharomyces cerevisiae selected under the unique code MUCL™ 39885 and deposited in the Belgian collections of micro-organisms/Mycothèque de l’Université Catholique de Louvain.  Biosprint has gained the EU authorization as feed additive for beef cattle, piglets, sows, dairy cows and horses.  According to several tests, the influence of Biosprint on the diet consists of the improvement of the digestive efficiency and of the better assimilation of nutrients.

References
1. ^ EFSA (European Food safety Authority), 2004. Opinion of the Scientific Panel on Additives and Products or Substances used in Animal Feed on a request from the Commission on the safety of “Biosprint BCCM™/MUCL39885” for dairy cows. The EFSA Journal 26, 1–6. https://efsa.onlinelibrary.wiley.com/doi/abs/10.2903/j.efsa.2004.26

2. ^ EFSA JournalEFSA (European Food safety Authority), Scientific Opinion on the safetyand efficacy of Biosprint®(Saccharomyces cerevisiae) as a feed additive for horses - EFSA Panel on Additives and Products or Substances used in Animal Feed (FEEDAP), Parma, Italy   http://www.bezpecna-krmiva.cz/soubory/biosprint.pdf

3. ^ EFSA Journal (2009); 1(9), SCIENTIFIC OPINION on the safety and the efficacy of Biosprint® (Saccharomyces cerevisiae) as a feed additive for sows. Scientific Opinion of the Panel on Additives and Products or Substances used in Animal Feed (Question No EFSA-Q-2008-302) Adopted on 3 February 2009 https://www.efsa.europa.eu/en/efsajournal/pub/3174

4. ^ All about feed, Biosprint gets EU authorization for sows: http://www.allaboutfeed.net/Home/General/2009/10/Biosprint-gets-EU-authorization-for-sows-AAF003693W/

5. ^ EFSA Journal(2013);11(4), SCIENTIFIC OPINION on the efficacy of Biosprint®(Saccharomyces cerevisiae) as a feed additive for cattle fattening, EFSA Panel on Additives and Products or Substances used in Animal Feed (FEEDAP), European Food Safety Authority (EFSA), Parma, Italy  http://www.efsa.europa.eu/en/efsajournal/pub/3174

External links
http://www.biosprint.bio

Food additives